Dalhousie Station may represent:

 Dalhousie Station, Quebec, a town in Quebec
 Dalhousie station (Calgary), a CTrain light rail station in Calgary, Alberta, Canada
 Dalhousie Station (Montreal), a former railway station in Montreal, Quebec, Canada
 Dalhousie Station (South Australia), a pastoral lease in South Australia

See also
Dalhousie (disambiguation)